Malcolm Thurlby, teaches art and architectural history at York University, Toronto. His research interests focus on Romanesque and Gothic architecture and sculpture in Europe and 19th and early 20th century architecture in Canada.

Early life 
Thurlby was born in London in 1948; the birth registered at the Paddington District Office.

Thurlby attended Watford Grammar School for Boys from 1960 to 1968. From there he went to the University of East Anglia, graduating in 1971 with a B.A. For postgraduate research at East Anglia, he was awarded a PhD in 1976. His thesis, Transitional Sculpture in England (1150—1240), was supervised by Eric Fernie.

Academic life 
In 1983 Thurlby moved to Canada to lecture at York University, Toronto where he continues to work specialising in Romanesque and Gothic architecture and sculpture.  He is now Professor of Medieval Art and Architecture, Canadian Architecture in the Graduate Programme in Art History, in the Department of Visual Art and Art History.

Thurlby was made a Fellow of the Society of Antiquaries, London in 1987. He is a Fellow of the Royal Historical Society.

Selected publications

Books as author 

 Romanesque Architecture and Sculpture in Wales, Almeley, Logaston Press, 2006. ISBN 978-1904396505
 The Herefordshire School of Romanesque Sculpture, Almeley, Logaston Press, 2013. ISBN 978-1906663728
 The Architecture and Sculpture of Deerhurst Priory: The Later 11th, 12th and Early 13th Centuries, Deerhurst Walton, Friends of Deerhurst, 2014. ISBN 978-0954948467

Journals 

 Anglo-Saxon Reminiscences and other aspects of the Romanesque Fabric of Worcester Cathedral, Transactions of the Worcestershire Archaeological Society, 26 (2018), pp 113-148
 The Abbey Church of Lessay (Manche) and Romanesque Architecture in North East England, The Antiquaries Journal. Volume 94 (2014), pp 71-92, Cambridge University Press
 Christ Church, Maugerville, New Brunswick: Bishop John Medley, Frank Wills and the Transmission of Ecclesiological Principles in Anglican Churches in Canada’, Journal of the Society for the Study of Architecture in Canada, 38, no. 1 (2013), pp 21-28

Chapters in books 

 Articulation as an Expression of Function in Romanesque Architecture, in Jill A. Franklin, T.A. Heslop and Christine Anderson (eds), (2012), Architecture and Interpretation: Essays for Eric Fernie, Woodbridge, Boydell and Brewer ISBN 9781782040491
 The Building of a Cathedral: The Romanesque and Early Gothic Fabric, in Douglas Pocock (ed) (2014) Durham Cathedral: A Celebration, Durham, City of Durham Trust ISBN 9780902776029

Online blogs 

 First Rate Gothic: A Look at St. Paul's Presbyterian Church, Hamilton.

Photography 
Thurlby used his own photographic slides in lectures and to illustrate his writings. Photographs attributed to him are to be found in the Conway Library at the Courtauld Institute of Art, London. This collection comprises mostly architectural and sculptural images and contains glass and film negatives as well as prints. It is currently in the process of being digitised as part the wider project 'Courtauld Connects'.

References

External links
 profile from Carleton University website

Living people
British art historians
Romanesque architecture
Gothic architecture
Alumni of the University of East Anglia
Fellows of the Society of Antiquaries of London
Fellows of the Royal Historical Society
Year of birth missing (living people)